The women's high jump event  at the 2000 European Athletics Indoor Championships was held on February 25–26.

Medalists

Results

Qualification
Qualification: Qualification Performance 1.93 (Q) or at least 8 best performers advanced to the final.

Final

References
Results

High jump at the European Athletics Indoor Championships
High
2000 in women's athletics